Cosmopterix kuznetzovi is a moth in the family Cosmopterigidae. It was described by Sinev in 1988.

References

Natural History Museum Lepidoptera generic names catalog

Moths described in 1988
kuznetzovi